Hedvig Christina Wigert née Falk (February 1748 – 4 January 1780) was a Swedish opera singer. She belonged to the pioneer generation of performers of the Royal Swedish Opera.

Hedvig Falk belonged to the first group of singers hired at the foundation of the Royal Swedish Opera in Bollhuset in 1773.

The employment of Wigert illustrates social and gender related issues. There was an initial difficulty to enroll female singers because the profession had a low status in the 18th-century. Wigert also illustrate the fact that people from the upper class participated in the Opera project of the king. Similar to the case of Elisabeth Olin, Wigert was a member of the upper class, and though she herself was willing to participate, her employment was delayed by the disapproval of "Two old powder-witches" in her family. Eventually, she was given a contract which stipulated that she would be allowed to resign whenever her family wished her to, as long as she participated in the inauguration performance.

After Doris in Thetis och Pélée, in the inauguration performance of the Opera 18 January 1773, (where she played opposite Carl Stenborg (Pélée), Elisabeth Olin (Thetis), Lars Lalin (Jupiter),  (Neptune), Nils Gustav Stenborg (Mercury), (Elisabeth) Betty Olin (Amor) and Hans Björkman and Johan Filip Lising).  She continued to play "many demanding parts".  Among her parts where performed some theatre parts, during a period when the Opera offered this. Her best remembered part was the title role of Mérope by Voltaire in the 1777–78 season after her marriage, where according to the papers, she "was given lively approval" by the audience.  Other roles was Corinna in Acis and Galathea by Händel, and Euridyce in Oprpheus by Gluck.  She was described as unanimously admired, with a "noble" and versatile way of acting.

She married the cashier Gustaf Wigert in 1776.

References

 Kungliga teaterns repertoar 1773–1973 ['Repertoire of the Royal Theatre 1773–1973'], 1974 (Swedish)
 Oscar Levertin: Teater och drama under Gustaf III, Albert Bonniers förlag, Stockholm, Fjärde Upplagan (1920). ['Teater och drama under Gustaf III'] (in Swedish)
 Fredrik August Dahlgren: Förteckning öfver svenska skådespel uppförda på Stockholms theatrar 1737–1863 och Kongl. Theatrarnes personal 1773–1863. Med flera anteckningar. (List of Performances staged at the theatres of Stockholm from 1737 to 18863 and the staff of the royal theatres from 1773 to 1863) (Swedish)
 Jonsson, Leif & Ivarsdotter, Anna (red.), Musiken i Sverige. 2, Frihetstid och gustaviansk tid 1720–1810, Fischer, Stockholm, 1993 (Music in Sweden. The age of Liberty and the Gustavian age 1720–1810) 
 Johan Flodmark: Stenborgska skådebanorna: bidrag till Stockholms teaterhistoria, Norstedt, Stockholm, 1893 
 Nordensvan, Georg, Svensk teater och svenska skådespelare från Gustav III till våra dagar. Förra delen, 1772–1842, Bonnier, Stockholm, 1917(Swedish theatre and Swedish actors from Gustav III to our days. First book 1772–1842) (Swedish)

1748 births
1780 deaths
Swedish operatic sopranos
18th-century Swedish women opera singers
Gustavian era people